The Paraguayan Civil War was a civil war fought in Paraguay from 15 July 1911 to 11 May 1912. It started when members of the Liberal Party, led by Eduardo Schaerer and former president Manuel Gondra revolted against the rule of Liberato Marcial Rojas, and against major Albino Jara. It ended when Albino Jara was ambushed and killed near Paraguarí, allowing Eduardo Schaerer to assume the role of the 25th President of Paraguay.  

Meredith Reid Sarkees and Frank Whelon Wayman maintain that the 1911 Paraguayan Civil War was symptomatic of a decades-long period of instability in Paraguay following the Paraguayan War.

References

External links 

LA GUERRA CIVIL DEL CENTENARIO 1911-1912 (In Spanish)

Wars involving Paraguay
Conflicts in 1911
Conflicts in 1912
1911 in Paraguay
1912 in Paraguay